Robert Ellis (born 19 May 1940) is a Scottish former first-class cricketer.

Ellis was born at Kilmarnock in May 1940. He was educated at Kilmarnock Academy, before matriculating to the University of Edinburgh. A club cricketer for Kilmarnock Cricket Club, Ellis made his debut for Scotland in first-class cricket against Warwickshire at Edinburgh in 1963. Ellis played first-class cricket for Scotland until 1974, making ten appearances. As a batsman, he scored 133 runs at an average of 13.30, with a highest score of 35. With his right-arm medium pace bowling, he took 6 wickets at a bowling average of 63.63; in first-class cricket, he bowled a total of 129 overs. He later played club cricket for Ayr Cricket Club, captaining the side from 1980 to 1982. Outside of cricket, he was by profession a schoolteacher.

References

External links
 

1940 births
Living people
Sportspeople from Kilmarnock
People educated at Kilmarnock Academy
Alumni of the University of Edinburgh
Scottish schoolteachers
Scottish cricketers